This is a list of World War II conferences of the Allies of World War II. Conference names in boldface indicate the conferences at which the leaders of the United States, the United Kingdom, and the Soviet Union were all present. For the historical context see Diplomatic history of World War II.

In total Churchill attended 16.5 meetings, Roosevelt 12, and Stalin 7.

For some of the major wartime conference meetings involving Roosevelt and later Truman, the code names were words which included a numeric prefix corresponding to the ordinal number of the conference in the series of such conferences. The third conference was  TRIDENT, the fourth conference was QUADRANT, the sixth conference was SEXTANT, and the eighth conference was OCTAGON. The last wartime conference was code-named TERMINAL.

See also 

Allies of World War II
Diplomatic history of World War II
Grand Alliance (World War II)
Four Policemen
Greater East Asia Conference
List of Axis World War II conferences

References

Further reading
What major conferences were held during World War II?, website of the Franklin D. Roosevelt Presidential Library
 United States Army Center of Military History
 Planning for Coalition Warfare, 1941 -1942
 Strategic Planning for Coalition Warfare, 1943 -1944
 Washington Command Post: The Operations Division
 Appendix C: Principals at the international conferences January 1943—September 1944

 
Conferences
World War II conferences
Conferences
C